The SABIA-Mar, originally called SAC-E by CONAE, is a dual satellite joint Earth observation mission. The mission objective is to study the oceanic biosphere, its changes over time, and how it is affected by and reacts to human activity. It will focus on the monitoring of ocean surfaces, especially studying the ocean ecosystem, the carbon cycle, and marine habitats, as well as ocean mapping.

This collaboration between the Argentine (CONAE) and the Brazilian (AEB) space agencies was originally supposed to make two identical spacecraft with Argentina supplying the payload and Brazil the satellite bus. The satellites, SABIA-Mar A and SABIA-Mar B, were supposed to fly in 2017 and 2018, and operate until 2021.

By 2016, CONAE announced that a new agreement had been reached, where Argentina would build SABIA-Mar 1, and Brazil would build SABIA-Mar 2. The Argentine satellite, SABIA-Mar 1, is supposed to fly in 2024.

SABIA-Mar 1 
SABIA-Mar 1 will be designed and built by the Argentine technological company INVAP. They will act as prime contractor and integrator, as well as supply two instruments. It is expected to be launched in late 2024, have a 5-year design life, and fly on a sun-synchronous orbit with a four-day revisit frequency. It successfully passed PDR in April 2016 which marked the end of Phase B development, and the project entered Phase C (detailed design). In April 2018, the Critical Design Review (CDR) of the flight segment was approved.

SABIA-Mar 2 
SABIA-Mar 2 will be built in Brazil on the Multi-Mission Platform (MMP), the satellite bus developed for Amazônia-1. It is expected to be launched sometime in the 2020s.

Instruments 
Source:
 Global House: multispectral camera CCD camera with 1.1 km resolution
 Regional Chamber: CCS multispectral camera with 200 m resolution
 SST camera
 Chamber of images to ground

See also 

 Brazilian space program

References 

Satellites of Argentina
Earth observation satellites of Brazil
2024 in spaceflight
Twin satellites
Proposed satellites